Peter Udell (born 1934) is an American lyricist and writer, best known for his collaborations with composer Gary Geld.

He started his career in popular music in the 1960s, writing lyrics for songs including "Sealed With A Kiss", "Save Your Heart for Me" and "Hurting Each Other".

Udell wrote the lyrics and co-wrote the book for the Broadway musicals Purlie (1970), Shenandoah (1975), Angel (1978), Comin' Uptown (1979) and Amen Corner (1983).

He received a Tony Award for Best Book of a Musical for Shenandoah, and was also nominated for Best Original Score.

References 

American lyricists
1934 births
Broadway composers and lyricists
Living people
Tony Award winners